The European Collectivity of Alsace is a territorial collectivity in the Alsace region of France. On 1 January 2021, the departments of Bas-Rhin and Haut-Rhin merged into a territorial collectivity but remained part of the region Grand Est. The creation of this new entity was voted by the French Parliament on 25 July 2019 and Law 2019-816 delimiting its powers was promulgated on 2 August 2019.

Alsatian voters had already voted in favour of the creation of a single territorial collectivity in a referendum in 2013; however, in the less populous of the two departments, Haut-Rhin, a majority of voters had rejected the proposal.

History

The original Region of Alsace, created in 1956, ceased to exist on 1 January 2016 when the French parliament voted to merge some administrative regions, reducing their number from 22 to 18.

Status

Alsace has an intermediary status: its competencies are those of a department, plus some of the competencies of a region. Alsace is therefore less autonomous than Corsica or the overseas departments and regions.

Languages

While French is the sole official language of the country according to Article 2 of the Constitution of France, Law 2019-816 contains provisions to promote regional languages at school. The collectivity will also be tasked to create a Committee related to the German language in Alsace. This last provision is closely related to Chapter 3 and Chapter 4 of the Aachen Treaty.

References

External links
 European Collectivity of Alsace 

2021 establishments in France
States and territories established in 2021
France articles needing attention
Proposed political divisions
Politics of Alsace
Territorial evolution of France
Subdivisions of France